Olympic Football Club is a semi-professional soccer club based in Brisbane, Queensland. The club was founded in 1967 and currently competes in the National Premier Leagues Queensland, with home matches played at Goodwin Park. The club has grown tremendously in the past 15 years growing from 190 registered players to over 855 players.

History
Olympic FC was founded in 1967 by Greek immigrants, under the name Pan Rhodian Soccer Club, affiliated with Queensland Soccer Association. The following year the club joined the Queensland Soccer Federation, changing its name to Brisbane Olympic United as a condition of joining the federation. The club colours were originally blue and white until changing to red and white in the late 2000s.  In 2008, the club again changed its name to Olympic FC upon joining the Queensland State League (QSL). After playing in the QSL in 2008 and 2009, the club elected to play in the Brisbane Premier League for the 2010 season.

The Queensland State League was ultimately superseded by the National Premier Leagues competition. In 2013, Olympic FC was awarded a licence to compete in the inaugural Queensland National Premier Leagues season, a recognition of the club's stature in the state. The NPL is Australia's second highest footballing tier.

Club performance
Olympic has won NPL Queensland competition on one occasion. In the competition's inaugural 2013 season, Olympic secured a league premiership with two rounds remaining, defeating Moreton Bay United 3–1. Olympic FC then secured a victory over Brisbane City 3–3 (3–0) on penalties in the NPL Queensland Grand Final at Goodwin Park. Since 2013, Olympic FC has continued to perform well in the competition, securing multiple top table finishes.

The club lost 2–1 to Lions FC again in the 2018 NPL Queensland Grand Final at Lions Stadium.

Olympic FC has played in the national rounds of the FFA Cup on two occasion. The club qualified in 2014, progressing to the Round of 16 before losing narrowly to the Central Coast Mariners, an A-League, professional side. The club qualified again in 2018, but lost to local rivals Lions FC in the Round of 32.

Home ground 
Olympic FC first played at Pineapple Park, a field near the Gabba Cricket Ground in Kangaroo Point. In the 1970s, Olympic moved to Dutton Park. In 1982, the club moved to the current home ground in Yeronga, Goodwin Park.

Notable players
Olympic FC has developed notable players. Michael Zullo, A-League champion and Socceroo, played for Olympic FC as a boy.

Jai Ingham and Dane Ingham both spent formative years at the club before playing professionally in the A-League. Both brothers have played for New Zealand internationally, with Dane Ingham notably starting all of New Zealand's matches at the 2017 FIFA Confederations Cup, competing against Cristiano Ronaldo when playing Portugal. Dane was just 18 when making his debut, making him the second youngest player to ever play at the FIFA Confederations Cup.

Current squad

References

External links
Olympic FC Official Website

National Premier Leagues clubs
Queensland State League soccer teams
Brisbane Premier League teams
Association football clubs established in 1967
1967 establishments in Australia